John or Jack Lyon may refer to:

John Lyon (botanist) (1765–1814) Scottish botanist and plant 
John Lyon (boxer) (born 1962), English boxer
John Lyon (commissioner) (born 1948), British Parliamentary Commissioner for Standards (2008–12)
John Lyon (cricketer) (1951–2010), cricketer for Lancashire
John Lyon, Lord of Glamis (1340–1382), Chamberlain of Scotland
John Lyon, 1st Master of Glamis (died 1435), see Earl of Strathmore and Kinghorne
John Lyon, 3rd Lord Glamis (1431–1497)
John Lyon, 4th Lord Glamis (died 1500)
John Lyon, 6th Lord Glamis (died 1528)
John Lyon, 7th Lord Glamis (1510–1558), (forfeit in 1537 but restored in 1543)
John Lyon, 8th Lord Glamis (died 1578), Scottish nobleman, judge and Lord High Chancellor of Scotland
John Lyon (school founder) (died 1592), English founder of Harrow School
John Lyon, 4th Earl of Strathmore and Kinghorne (1663–1712)
John Lyon, 5th Earl of Strathmore and Kinghorne (1696–1715)
John Lyon (poet) (1803–1889), Scottish LDS poet
John Herbert Bowes-Lyon (1886–1930)
John Bowes, 9th Earl of Strathmore and Kinghorne (1737–1776), born John Lyon
John Lyon, name of several people of Clan Lyon in Scotland
John Lyon (born 1948), the real name of singer Southside Johnny
Jack Lyon (1898–1941), New Zealand politician
Jack Lyon (footballer) (1893–1975), English footballer

See also
John Lyons (disambiguation)